{{Infobox basketball game|game_name=2022 BNXT Supercup|event=|image=|season=|caption=|team1=Filou Oostende|team1association=Belgium|team1score=90|team2=Heroes Den Bosch|team2association=Netherlands|team2score=82|details=|date=20:30|stadium=COREtec Dôme|attendance=1,500|city=Ostend|mvp=|previous=2021|next=''2023}}

The 2022 BNXT Supercup''' was the 2nd edition of the BNXT Supercup, the supercup of the BNXT League. The game was played on 17 September 2022 in the COREtec Dôme in Ostend. Filou Oostende won its second consecutive supercup.

Match details

References 

Supercup
Supercup
BNXT Supercup